New Ross was a constituency represented in the Irish House of Commons until its abolition on 1 January 1801.

Members of Parliament
 1560: Nicholas Heron and William Dormer
 1585: Jasper Duff and William Bennett
 1613–1615: Matthew Shee and James FitzHenry
 1634–1635: Nicholas Dormer and Peter Rothe
 1639–1649: Nicholas Dormer (expelled 1642) and Chichester Brook (expelled 1642)
 1661–1666: Sir Thomas Dancer, 1st Baronet and Henry Nicholls

1689–1801

References

Constituencies of the Parliament of Ireland (pre-1801)
Historic constituencies in County Wexford
New Ross
1800 disestablishments in Ireland
Constituencies disestablished in 1800